Philip Anthony Smith (born 14 December 1979) is an English professional footballer who plays as a goalkeeper for National League South club Weston-super-Mare.

Career

Millwall and non-League football
Born in Harrow, London, Smith started his career with Millwall for whom he played 5 league matches in the 1998–1999 season. He remained on Millwalls books until 2001 without making any further appearances but was loaned to non-league clubs Bromley, Ashford Town, Croydon and Walton & Hersham. Whilst at Walton & Hersham Smith scored a (wind-assisted) goal against Barton Rovers. On his release from Millwall in 2001 he reverted to non-league football, briefly with Folkestone Invicta and then with Dover Athletic.

Margate
Commencing in July 2002 Smith played at Football Conference club Margate for two seasons playing a total of 64 league matches. In his second season he was ever-present in the team playing a total of 55 competitive matches.

Crawley Town
In July 2004 Smith signed for Crawley Town, where he was regular first choice goalkeeper for the Red Devils. He made his debut on 30 August 2004, against Dagenham & Redbridge, and kept a clean sheet. In his first season, Smith made 35 appearances, followed by 39 in his second. Crawley went into administration in 2006 and subsequently made all of their players available for transfer.

Swindon Town
Smith signed for Swindon Town after a successful pre-season trial which included winning the Copa Ibiza friendly competition in the summer of 2006. Smith move to Swindon was partly helped by then Swindon manager Dennis Wise knowing Smith from his spell at Millwall when Wise was first team manager.

Smith was initially signed as backup to first choice goalkeeper Peter Brezovan and handed the #25 jersey for the 2006–07 season. After Brezovan suffered a broken arm in a home game against Grimsby Town on 14 October 2006, Smith took over in goal after an unsuccessful two game loan spell from Andrew Lonergan (loaned from Preston North End). He picked up the PFA Fans Player of the Month for December 2006. This award was presented to him on 27 January 2007, before the home game against Macclesfield Town, after a string of solid displays kept Swindon in the automatic promotion places. Smith was also rewarded for his efforts, with a two-year contract extension. His consistent displays between the sticks during the season did not go unnoticed by the fans, who named him Swindon's 'Fans Player of the Season' in May 2007.

In the following season, Smith granted his place as a first choice keeper and received the #1 jersey, where he continued to impress then manager Paul Sturrock. He performed well in the opening match of the 2007–08 season away to Northampton Town, where Swindon drew 1–1. He continued his outstanding performances, remaining first choice, keeping his first clean sheet of the season in the 5–0 thrashing of Gillingham at The County Ground. The arrival of Maurice Malpas as manager midway through the season saw the first choice goalkeeping position up for grabs, with neither Smith or other Swindon goalkeeper Peter Brezovan able to hold down the position on a regular basis.

Smith played 25 games in the 2008–09 season, in which Swindon were involved in a relegation battle for much of the campaign. During the pre-season of 2009/2010 season, new Swindon manager Danny Wilson brought in experienced goalkeeper David Lucas and handed him the #1 jersey. Smith was handed the #12 jersey. He did not feature on a regular basis, but when called upon, put in some good displays, including an outstanding game against Exeter City on 6 October 2009 in the Football League Trophy and a man of the match display in the League One Playoff Semi-Final Second Leg against Charlton Athletic, after David Lucas was forced off with injury after just 2 minutes. Swindon won the tie after a penalty shoot-out victory.

On 25 February 2010, Smith agreed a new contract extension with the club until the summer of 2012. He began the 2010–11 season as backup to David Lucas. However, injuries and a poor form from Lucas allowed Smith to make 27 appearances during the season. The season ultimately lead to a 24th-place finish and relegation to League Two.

Smith was second choice keeper after Wes Foderingham at Swindon in the 2011–12 season, after the arrival of Paolo Di Canio as new manager, but ahead of third choice Italian goalkeeper Mattia Lanzano.

On 18 May 2012, Smith was released by Swindon after over 6 years playing for the club. Until his departure, Smith was the longest serving player in the Swindon Town squad, having served the club from 2006 until 2012.

Portsmouth

On 7 December 2012, Smith signed a one-month contract with Portsmouth, initially as a backup for Simon Eastwood. Smith's first public game in a Portsmouth shirt came in a fundraising friendly at Fratton Park against ÍBV Vestmannaeyjar managed by former Portsmouth legend Hermann Hreidarsson. On 8 May 2013, he signed a one-year contract extension with Pompey.

Smith made his Pompey debut on 6 August, in a Football League Cup match against AFC Bournemouth. After an impressive performance he went on to play 3 league games, before making a mistake in a 2–2 draw away to Mansfield. He now plays in the Development Squad and is a second choice keeper behind Trevor Carson.

In November 2013, Smith joined Conference Premier side Dartford on a one-month loan deal.

He was released by Portsmouth at the end of the season.

Aldershot Town
Following his release by Portsmouth, Smith signed for Conference side Aldershot Town.

Career statistics

References

External links

Phil Smith biography Margate Football Club History

1979 births
Living people
Footballers from Harrow, London
English footballers
England semi-pro international footballers
Association football goalkeepers
Millwall F.C. players
Bromley F.C. players
Ashford United F.C. players
Croydon F.C. players
Walton & Hersham F.C. players
Folkestone Invicta F.C. players
Dover Athletic F.C. players
Margate F.C. players
Crawley Town F.C. players
Swindon Town F.C. players
Portsmouth F.C. players
Dartford F.C. players
Aldershot Town F.C. players
English Football League players
Southern Football League players
National League (English football) players